The Merchant Shipping (Scottish Fishing Boats) Act 1920 (10 & 11 Geo. V c. 39) was an Act of Parliament concerning fishing in Scotland. It became law on 16 August 1920.

It provided that Part IV of the Merchant Shipping Act 1894 would apply to Scotland. The Act came into force from 1 October 1920. It was repealed by the Merchant Shipping Act 1995.

See also
Merchant Shipping Act

References
Oliver & Boyd's new Edinburgh almanac and national repository for the year 1921. p228

External links

United Kingdom Acts of Parliament 1920
Fisheries law
Acts of the Parliament of the United Kingdom concerning Scotland
1920 in Scotland
Shipping in Scotland
Fishing in Scotland